Du Jincai (born October 1952) is a retired general (shangjiang) of the People's Liberation Army who served as Secretary of the Commission for Discipline Inspection of the Central Military Commission. He was also Deputy Secretary of the Central Commission for Discipline Inspection (CCDI), and a member of the CCDI Standing Committee.

Biography
Du was born in Jing County, Hebei. He joined the military in 1970. He later served as the deputy director of the Political Department of the Xinjiang Military Region, then promoted to the same position in the Lanzhou Military Region (one level higher). In July 2005 he became the political commissar of the 21st Group Army (under the Beijing Military Region) of the PLA. In December 2006, he became the head of the Political Department of the Chengdu Military Region, and a year later was named assistant to the chief of the Political Work Department. In December 2009, was he further promoted to deputy director of the General Political Department. He was awarded the rank of General in July 2012.

Du earned a series of promotions at the 18th National Congress of the Chinese Communist Party, becoming the head of discipline inspection in the military, overseeing the army's anti-corruption efforts, and concurrently the Deputy Secretary of the CCDI.

Du was a member of the 18th Central Committee of the Chinese Communist Party.

References

Living people
1952 births
People's Liberation Army generals from Hebei
People from Hengshui
Members of the 18th Central Committee of the Chinese Communist Party